Pseuderanthemum carruthersii, the Carruthers' falseface, is a species of plant in the family Acanthaceae. It is native from the Solomon Islands to Vanuatu.

Chemical analysis
The Carruthers' falseface is highly used in researches for extracting many chemical compounds. The following chemicals can be found in the plant.

Lignans
 Eudesmin 
 Magnolin 
 Syringaresinol 
 Episyringaresinol 
 1-hydroxysyringaresinol 
 Pseuderesinol 
 Pseuderanoside

Triterpenes
 Squalene 
 Oleanolic acid 
 Lupeol  
 Betulin 
 Betulinic acid
 Pseuderanic acid

References

carruthersii